The men's 3000 metres event at the 2017 European Athletics Indoor Championships will be held on 3 March 2017 at 18:25 (heats) and on 5 March 16:55 (final) local time.

Medalists

Records

Results

Heats

Qualification: First 4 in each heat (Q) and the next 4 fastest (q) advance to the Final.

Final

References

2017 European Athletics Indoor Championships
3000 metres at the European Athletics Indoor Championships